The FIBT World Championships 2001 took place in St. Moritz, Switzerland (Men's bobsleigh) and Calgary, Alberta, Canada (Women's bobsleigh, and men's and women's Skeleton). The Swiss city had hosted the event for the record twentieth time, doing so previously in 1931 (Four-man), 1935 (Four-man), 1937 (Four-man), 1938 (Two-man), 1939 (Two-man), 1947, 1955, 1957, 1959, 1965, 1970, 1974, 1977, 1982, 1987, 1989 (Skeleton), 1990 (Bobsleigh), 1997 (Bobsleigh), and 1998 (Skeleton). Calgary hosted the championship event for the third time, doing so previously in 1992 (Skeleton) and 1996.

Bobsleigh

Two man

Four man

Two woman

Skeleton

Men

Women

Coomber earned the first medal for Great Britain at the championships since 1966.

Medal table

References
2-Man bobsleigh World Champions
2-Woman bobsleigh World Champions
4-Man bobsleigh World Champions
Men's skeleton World Champions
Women's skeleton World Champions

2001 in bobsleigh
IBSF World Championships
2001 in skeleton
Sport in Calgary
Sport in St. Moritz
2001 in Swiss sport
2001 in Canadian sports
2001 in Alberta
International sports competitions hosted by Canada
Bobsleigh in Switzerland
International sports competitions hosted by Switzerland
Bobsleigh in Canada
Skeleton in Canada